The Kaliningrad Nuclear Power Plant (also referred as Baltic Nuclear Power Plant (NPP) or Baltiiskaya NPP) is a nuclear power plant under construction  south-east of Neman, in Kaliningrad Oblast, Russia. It is seen as a counter-project to the (later scrapped) plan to build the Visaginas nuclear power plant in Lithuania and is considered not only as an energy, but also as a geopolitical project. Originally intending to commission the reactors in 2016 and 2018, construction was temporarily stopped in June 2013 for the project to be redesigned for lower power output after neighbouring countries showed no interest in importing its electricity. However, the downgrade was later discarded.
No export partners materialised as of 2021 and the project remains in stand-by.

Motivation
The nuclear power plant is foreseen to secure power supply for the Kaliningrad Oblast and to replace natural gas-based power generation. It has been mentioned that the Kaliningrad Oblast needs the project "because for the time being it imports energy from NATO countries." The excess electricity was planned to be exported into the EU market. According to Sergey Boyarkin, deputy general director of Rosenergoatom, the first reactor would be sufficient for Kaliningrad Oblast's needs, while electricity produced by the second reactor would be exported when not filling gaps in generation caused by refuelling and downtime. Lithuania, Poland and Germany were named as potential export markets.

Sergey Boyarkin has said that the shutdown of Ignalina Nuclear Power Plant combined with Polish plans to scrap coal-fired generation in compliance with environmental regulation means that the Baltic region faces an energy crisis by 2015. He also has said that Kaliningrad Oblast will be isolated from electricity supplies from Russia if the Baltic states de-synchronize themselves from the Russian electricity grid and join the synchronous grid of Continental Europe (ENTSO-E grid). He also mentioned technical complications and unreliability in electricity transfer from Smolensk Nuclear Power Plant, the main supplier of Kaliningrad Oblast, via Belarus and Lithuania.

On the other hand, the project has been seen as a counter-project to the Visaginas nuclear power plant project in Lithuania. Russia invited Lithuania to participate in the project, instead of building the nuclear power plant in Lithuania.

History
A framework construction agreement was signed between the head of Rosatom Sergei Kiriyenko and Governor of Kaliningrad Oblast Georgy Boos on 16 April 2008. Russian Prime Minister Vladimir Putin signed the order for construction of the 2,300 MW plant in September 2009. Ground preparation works started on 25 February 2010. The first concrete was scheduled to be laid in April 2011, but was delayed until February 2012.

On 4 June 2013, an order of Atomenergoproject, dated 30 May 2013 and published on 4 June 2013, ordered a series of staffing and budgeting overhauls "in connection with the mothballing of the Baltic NPP and NIAEP budget adjustments for 2013." It was later said that the project will be temporary stopped to reconsider the project's design in case there will be no export to the European Union. On 4 July 2013, Sergey Kiriyenko, head of Rosatom, announced that both units will be built like previously planned, with two VVER-1200 and no smaller reactor.

Technical features
The original design had foreseen two VVER-1200/491 pressurized water reactors in an AES-2006 standard design configuration. The reactors have a capacity of 1150 MWe each and would be supplied by Atomstroyexport.

The first reactor was planned to be operational by 2017 and the second reactor by 2018. Cost was expected to be around €6.8 billion (US$8.8 billion) Two further reactors could be added in the future depending on economic development in Kaliningrad and in the Baltic region in general.

The redesigned plan may consist of two reactors by capacity of 640 MW (VVER-640) and 40 MW (KLT-40S). An alternative foresees up to eight reactors by capacity of 40 MW each.

Project development
The project is developed by Rosatom's subsidiary Inter RAO UES. According to Rosatom, 49% of shares in the project will be offered to European companies. This would be the first Russian nuclear power plant with foreign participation. Potential investors named in this context are ČEZ, Enel, and Iberdrola. However, as of June 2013, no foreign partner has joined the project.

See also

Nuclear power in Russia

References

External links

 Construction Blog (Russian)

Nuclear power stations in Russia
Proposed power stations in Russia
Proposed nuclear power stations
Nuclear power stations with reactors under construction
Nuclear power stations with proposed reactors
Nuclear power stations using VVER reactors
Inter RAO
Buildings and structures in Kaliningrad Oblast